Marian Kozłowski (10 December 1927 in Warsaw, Poland – 15 August 2004 in Warsaw, Poland) was a Polish basketball administrator. He was a journalist, working as a deputy editor of the Express Wieczorny newspaper for many years. He was the president of the Polish Basketball Federation in 1957–1969 and 1980–1984 and the president of the Standing Conference of Europe (current FIBA Europe) in 1982–1990. He also served as vice president of FIBA. In 1996, he was awarded the FIBA Order of Merit. In 2007, he was enshrined as a contributor in the FIBA Hall of Fame.

External links
 FIBA Hall of Fame page on Kozlowski

1927 births
2004 deaths
Basketball players from Warsaw
FIBA Hall of Fame inductees
Basketball people in Poland
Burials at Powązki Cemetery